Carlton Hardy (born July 24, 1971) is an American college baseball coach. He is the head baseball coach at Savannah State University.

College

Hardy played college baseball at Grambling State from 1989 to 1991. At Grambling State, Hardy was First Team All Conference in 1990 and 1991. He graduated from Grambling State with a B.S in Computer Information Systems and a Master of Science degree in Sports Administration.

Career

Hardy played for the Martinsville Phillies in 1991 where he had a batting average of .133 and a fielding percentage of .921 at third base.

Hardy's coaching career began in 1998 as the Head coach of Talladega of the NAIA. He coached Talladega College for two seasons, leading the team to a 34-18 record (and the most wins in school history up to that point).

Hardy's next head coaching job was as the head coach of Olivet where he coached from 2000 to 2005 and turned around the program Hardy coached Olivet to a 105-123 record in his 6 seasons with the club.

Savannah State hired Hardy as their head coach in 2006.  

In July 2006, Hardy's alma mater, Grambling State hired Hardy as their head coach before Hardy decided to stay with Savannah State. 

Hardy is currently a member of the USA Today Sports board of coaches.

References

External links
 Savannah State profile

1971 births
Living people
Baseball third basemen
Grambling State Tigers baseball players
Martinsville Phillies players
Olivet Comets football coaches
Olivet Comets baseball coaches
Savannah State Tigers baseball coaches
Talladega Tornadoes baseball coaches
Baseball players from Los Angeles